Lagadia is a mountain village and a former municipality in Arcadia, Peloponnese, Greece. Since the 2011 local government reform it is part of the municipality Gortynia, of which it is a municipal unit. The municipal unit has an area of 79.475 km2. The seat of the municipality was the village Lagadia. It is considered a traditional settlement and is situated on a mountain slope, at about 1000 m elevation. It is 5 km east of Lefkochori, 10 km north of Dimitsana and 36 km northwest of Tripoli. The Greek National Road 74 (Pyrgos - Olympia - Tripoli) passes through the village.

The village has a school, a church, a post office, and a square. Kanellos Deligiannis and his brother Dimitrakis Deligiannis, two of the many heroes of the Greek War of Independence against the Turks in 1821, were born here.

Subdivisions
The municipal unit Langadia is subdivided into the following communities (constituent villages in brackets):
Lagadia (Lagadia, Agios Athanasios, Agios Nikolaos, Kaloneri, Pteria, Xerovouni)
Lefkochori (Lefkochori, Fouskari, Touthoa)

Population history

1949: 3,333
1981: 1,188 (village)
1991: 671 (village), 1,993 (municipality)
2001: 704 (village), 1,363 (municipality)
2011: 355 (village), 504 (community), 636 (municipal unit)

Geography

Climate
Lagadia is located in central Peloponnese and has a Mediterranean climate with hot and dry summers and milder winters.

Photo gallery

See also
List of settlements in Arcadia
List of traditional settlements of Greece

References

External links
Association of Langadia Youth - "Drasis"
Association of Langadians in Atrica
Langadia, Gortynia
GTP - Lagadia
GTP - Lagadia municipality

Populated places in Arcadia, Peloponnese